New Zealand political leader Bill Rowling assembled a shadow cabinet system amongst the Labour caucus following his position change to Leader of the Opposition in . He composed this of individuals who acted for the party as spokespeople in assigned roles while he was leader (1975–83).

As the Labour Party formed the largest party not in government, the frontbench team was as a result the Official Opposition of the New Zealand House of Representatives.

List of shadow ministers

Frontbench teams

January 1976
Rowling announced his first shadow cabinet in January 1976. It contained many changes following the defeat of many senior MPs in the 1975 general election and the death of Stan Whitehead.

February 1977
Rowling reallocated the portfolios of his shadow cabinet in February 1977 following the resignation of Colin Moyle who left parliament after controversial allegations made the previous year. Gerald O'Brien was relieved of all portfolios also following controversial allegations and recorded as being "on leave".

December 1978
Rowling reshuffled his shadow cabinet in December 1978 following Labour's defeat in the 1978 general election. He reduced the number of spokespersons from 31 to a more manageable 17. It was also notable for the omission of Matiu Rata as Shadow Minister of Maori Affairs, Rowling did not initially allocate the Maori Affairs portfolio to anyone else however.

Rowling announced changes in March 1979 owing to the ongoing illness of Bruce Barclay. Sir Basil Arthur was to act as agriculture spokesman and his shadow transport portfolio was given to Ron Bailey. Bailey's shadow works and development portfolio was given to Mick Connelly, who retained defence and police but the shadow foreign affairs role was transferred to Rowling. At the same time Mary Batchelor became spokesperson for women and family affairs. 

There was a minor reshuffle in October 1979. David Caygill was given charge of economic development to ease the workload of Bob Tizard, John Terris was given broadcasting from Ron Bailey and Arthur Faulkner (who at the time was in ill-health) was relieved of electoral reform and accident compensation to Ralph Maxwell and David Butcher respectively. Rowling made the decision to give the responsibilities to first-term MPs to "show off their abilities".

December 1979
Rowling instituted a new system in December 1979 where the shadow cabinet was separated from the party caucus. The shadow cabinet was limited to 15 members, the leader and deputy leader were granted automatic entry with an election held for the remaining 13 positions. The remaining MPs were allocated portfolios in a wider group.

Roger Douglas was sacked from the shadow cabinet on 30 June 1980 for releasing an "Alternative Budget" against Rowling's wishes which caused a minor reshuffle. Douglas' portfolios were given to Fraser Colman, while Colman's Housing portfolio was given to Mike Moore.

March 1981
Rowling reshuffled his shadow cabinet in March 1981 in preparation for the general election scheduled for the end of the year. He did not reinstate Douglas to the shadow cabinet. However, after Joe Walding unexpectedly announced his intention to retire, Rowling did reinstate Douglas to the shadow cabinet as his replacement in the Trade and Industry portfolio.

February 1982
Another election for the shadow cabinet was held on 4 February 1982 following Labour's narrow defeat in the 1981 general election. Two members of the previous shadow cabinet, Michael Bassett and Whetu Tirikatene-Sullivan, were voted out. Several changes were made to the membership via the caucus election results, after which Rowling reshuffled the portfolios.

References

New Zealand Labour Party
Rowling, Bill
1975 establishments in New Zealand
1983 disestablishments in New Zealand